William Edward Flannery (November 17, 1898 – January 25, 1959) was an American art director and architect for William Randolph Hearst. He won an Academy Award in the category Best Art Direction for the film Picnic.

As an architect, his projects included a beachside mansion for Hearst's girlfriend Marion Davies. The main mansion was demolished, but part of the property survives as the Annenberg Community Beach House.

Flannery married silent film actress Mary Mercedes Campbell and they had a son Patrick John, born in 1927. During the Great Depression he became an art director.

Select art direction
Film

 Forlorn River (1937) 
 Sons of the Legion (1938)
 Campus Confessions (1938)
 Disbarred (1939)
 Ambush (1939)
 Persons in Hiding (1939)
 Undercover Doctor (1939)
 Million Dollar Legs (1939)
 $1000 a Touchdown (1939) 
 All Women Have Secrets (1939) 
 Women Without Names (1940)
 Untamed (1940) 
 Golden Gloves (1940)
 North West Mounted Police (1940)
 World Premiere (1941)

 True to the Army (1942) 
 Mrs. Wiggs of the Cabbage Patch (1942)
 Night Plane from Chungking (1943)
 Dixie (film) (1943)
 Going My Way (1944)
 Murder, He Says (1945)
 Incendiary Blonde (1945) 
 Duffy's Tavern (1945)
 The Bells of St. Mary's (1945)
 Sister Kenny (1946)
 Abie's Irish Rose (1946) 
 Arch of Triumph (1948)
 The Sun Sets at Dawn (1950)
 Valentino (1951)

 My Son John (1952)
 The Savage (1952
 Never Wave at a WAC (1953)
 Captain Scarface (1953
 The Shanghai Story (1954)
 Phffft (1954) 
 Tarzan's Hidden Jungle (1955)
 Picnic (1955) 
 The Harder They Fall (1956)  
 Full of Life (1956)
 Space Ship Sappy (1957)
 The 30 Foot Bride of Candy Rock (1959)
 The Crimson Kimono (1959)
 Going My Way (1944) 

Television

 Damon Runyon Theater (2 episodes, 1955))
 Playhouse 90 (1 episode, 1957) 
 The Ford Television Theatre (15 episodes, 1956-1957) 

 Father Knows Best (5 episodes, 1956) 
 Shirley Temple's Storybook (4 episodes, 1958))
 The Donna Reed Show'' (1 episode, 1959)

References

External links

American art directors
Best Art Direction Academy Award winners
Artists from Toledo, Ohio
1898 births
1959 deaths